Sarajar (also Romanized as Sarājār; also known as Sarachar and Sarājār-e Pā’īn Maḩalleh) is a village in Shirju Posht Rural District, Rudboneh District, Lahijan County, Gilan Province, Iran. At the 2006 census, its population was 852, in 258 families.

References 

Populated places in Lahijan County